Arabul Islam is an Indian  politician and a member of All India Trinamool Congress. He was elected as MLA of Bhangar Vidhan Sabha Constituency in West Bengal Legislative Assembly in 2006.

References

Living people
Trinamool Congress politicians from West Bengal
West Bengal MLAs 2006–2011
1965 births